Instrumentals is the fourth studio album by German electronica duo Mouse on Mars. It was originally released by Sonig in 1997 on vinyl and was later reissued by Domino Recording Company and Thrill Jockey on CD in 2000.

Critical reception

Sean Cooper of AllMusic called Instrumentals Mouse on Mars' "most enjoyable and consistent effort." He stated that Instrumentals profiled "the group's more relaxed, experimental side, working tracks up out of a mush of warm, sputtery electronics and vaguely bouncing rhythms.

Track listing

Personnel
Credits adapted from liner notes.

Mouse on Mars
 Jan St. Werner – music
 Andi Toma – music

References

External links
 
 

1997 albums
Mouse on Mars albums
Domino Recording Company albums
Thrill Jockey albums
Instrumental albums